The Avengers/Ultraforce event was a two-part intercompany crossover between Malibu Comics and Marvel Comics. The first issue, Avengers/Ultraforce, was written by Glenn Herdling with art by Angel Medina and M. C. Wyman. The sequel, Ultraforce/Avengers, was written by Warren Ellis with art by George Pérez, who also illustrated wraparound covers on both issues.

Plot
The Asgardian god Loki enters the Ultraverse and collects the Infinity Gems from the possession of various Ultraverse's heroes, also discovering the existence of a seventh Gem: Ego. Loki learns the Infinity Gems were originally part of a gestalt entity known as "Nemesis". The Ego Gem possessed the Avenger Sersi when she arrived to Ultraverse from Earth-616.

The slaying of Nemesis caused a reality-changing effect  in the Ultraverse called the Black September.

Publication history
 Ultraforce/Avengers Prelude #1: "The Swords Are Drawn..." (Malibu Comics, July 1995) (it is numbered 11 in the indicia continuing Ultraforce's numbering)
 Avengers/Ultraforce #1 (Marvel Comics, October 1995)
 Ultraforce/Avengers #1: "Becoming More Like God" (Malibu Comics, Fall 1995)

References

External links
 
 
 

1995 comics debuts
Comics by George Pérez
Comics by Warren Ellis
Intercompany crossovers
Malibu Comics titles
Avengers (comics) titles
Ultraverse